Mouctar Diakhaby (born 19 December 1996) is a professional footballer who plays as a centre-back for La Liga club Valencia. Born in France, he plays for the Guinea national team.

Early life
Diakhaby was born in Vendôme, France, to Guinean parents. They were from Touba, Boké Region.

Club career

Lyon
Diakhaby made his first team debut for Lyon on 10 September 2016 in a Ligue 1 match against Bordeaux, playing the whole match in a 3–1 home loss. On 30 November 2016, he scored his first competitive goal for the Lyon first team in a 6–0 Ligue 1 away rout of Nantes.
On 23 February 2017, Diakhaby scored a goal (in the 89th minute) in the 2016–17 Europa League round of 32 second-leg 7–1 home win over AZ Alkmaar to register his first career UEFA Europa League or UEFA Champions League goal. He also scored a goal in each of two legs of the 2016–17 Europa League round of 16 tie against Roma.

Valencia

On 28 June 2018, Diakhaby signed a five-year deal with Spanish side Valencia.

International career
Diakhaby was born in France, but is of Guinean origin. He is a former youth international for France. In 2022 however he decided to represent the home country of his parents, Guinea and debuted for them against Egypt.

Career statistics

Club

Honours
Valencia
Copa del Rey: 2018–19

References

External links

 Profile at the Valencia CF website
 
 

1996 births
Living people
Sportspeople from Loir-et-Cher
People from Vendôme
French sportspeople of Guinean descent
French footballers
Guinean footballers
Association football defenders
Ligue 1 players
Olympique Lyonnais players
La Liga players
Valencia CF players
Guinean expatriate footballers
Guinean expatriate sportspeople in France
Guinean expatriate sportspeople in Spain
Expatriate footballers in Spain
France youth international footballers
France under-21 international footballers
Footballers from Centre-Val de Loire
Black French sportspeople